Underplay may refer to:

 Underplay, a term associated with Minimisation in psychology
 Underplay (cards), to follow suit with a lower card